Joseph Egerega (March 20, 1940 – February 3, 2013) was the Catholic bishop of the Vicariate Apostolic of Bomadi, Nigeria.

Ordained to the priesthood in 1969, Egerega was named bishop in 1997 and resigned in 2009.

Notes

1940 births
2013 deaths
21st-century Roman Catholic bishops in Nigeria
20th-century Roman Catholic bishops in Nigeria
Roman Catholic bishops of Bomadi